Duck Duck Goose is a 2018 computer-animated adventure comedy film directed by Chris Jenkins, who wrote the original story and co-wrote the screenplay with Rob Muir, Scott Atkinson, and Tegan West. It stars the voices of Jim Gaffigan, Zendaya and Carl Reiner. An international co-production between the United States, China and the United Kingdom, the film was released in China in March 2018 with an intended North American theatrical release date of April 2018; it was quietly pulled from the schedule following the closure of Open Road Films and was made available on Netflix on July 20, 2018.

Plot
Peng is a carefree goose whose flock is migrating in China. His attitude and demeanor is disapproved by leader Bing, who he and his flock abandon while Peng is asleep. Meanwhile, Chi and Chao, a pair of ducklings on their way to a mystical place called Pleasant Valley, ends up being separated from their flock due to a careless stunt from Peng. To hide from a sinister cat named Banzou, they end up sleeping with Peng after they see him fending off Banzou. Surprised by their presence, Peng ends up recklessly flying away from them before he breaks his wing with a gong. Flightless and frightened, Peng decides to use the ducklings to fend himself off from predators, and return safely to his flock. The ducklings reluctantly agree to go with him.

After a series of misadventures, Peng starts to grow on the ducklings, however, before he agrees to help the ducklings reunite with their flock, he comes across his own flock, where Chi and Chao discover his true intentions. The two groups end up parting their own separate ways, as they try to get to their destinations. Peng attempts to fly one more time, but is soon knocked down by hermit squirrel Carl. Carl builds Peng a makeshift wing for him. Inspired, Peng decides to use the wing to head back to Chi and Chao. However, when the ducklings reunite with their flock, they soon realize that Pleasant Valley is actually a restaurant that serves ducklings. Peng rescues Chi and Chao, however, during their escape, they get separated again. Banzou returns and holds the ducklings hostage, Peng confronts Banzou, but becomes badly injured from fighting him. Chi and Chao light a rocket and launch him into the sky to his demise.

Weakened, Peng tries to bring Chi and Chao back with his flock, but a snow storm makes him worse. The ducklings fly him towards the spring where the geese are, and Chao, remembering a honk Peng taught him calls for Peng's girlfriend Jingjing, who ultimately ends up rescuing him. The geese welcome the ducks, Bing allows the ducklings in the flock, even Peng who has now been responsible. Peng introduces Jingjing to Chi and Chao, and tells her that might end up having more children.

In a mid credits scene, Larry, a turtle who was trying to warn Peng of Banzou's intentions, makes his way to valley, only to find everyone gone.

Cast
 Jim Gaffigan as Peng, a swan goose who gets carried away by having fun
 Zendaya as Chi, a female baby duck who is Chao's older sister
 Lance Lim as Chao, a male baby duck who is Chi's younger brother
 Greg Proops as Banzou, a Pallas's cat with Dissociative identity disorder that causes him to alternate his eye colors while keeping one eye shut with yellow being a posh-talking personality and red being a wicked, croaky-talking one. Banzou acts as the main antagonist with the intent of killing Peng, Chi & Chao.
 Natasha Leggero as Jinjing, Peng's love interest.
 Stephen Fry as Frazier, a red-crowned crane who's mating with Giles
 Craig Ferguson as Giles, a red-crowned crane who's mating with Frazier
 Reggie Watts as Carl, a hippie squirrel who is a healer and a hang-glider. He healed Peng's wing when Peng needed help to fly
 Carl Reiner as Larry, a turtle
 Jennifer Grey as Edna, a female chicken 
 Diedrich Bader as Bing, a swan goose who is JinJing's father
 Rick Overton as Stanley, a male chicken

Release
The film was released in China on March 9, 2018. There, it would go on to gross $5,865,892 by the end of April. In other territories, it earned $9,434,082 for a worldwide total of $15,299,974. In 2019, the box office gross changed to $19,676,514.

It was originally intended to be theatrically released in the United States by Open Road Films on April 20, 2018, before being removed from the release schedule following the closure of Open Road Films, and ultimately ending up as a Netflix original film, with a projected release of July 20.

References

External links
 
 
 Official website
 Cannes: Open Road Nabs U.S. Rights to Animated 'Duck Duck Goose
 Zendaya’s ‘Duck Duck Goose’ Acquired by Open Road Films

2018 computer-animated films
2010s American animated films
Films scored by Mark Isham
American children's animated comedy films
Animated films about cats
Chinese animated films
Films about ducks
Films about turtles
Films set in China
Open Road Films animated films
2018 comedy films
2010s English-language films